Kherson is a city on the Black Sea, de jure part of Ukraine, in the eponymous raion of the eponymous oblast.

Kherson may also refer to:

Places
 Chersonesus (also: Khersonesos, Kherson), an Ancient Greek colony in Crimea
 Kherson Raion, Kherson Oblast, Ukraine; a district on the Black Sea
 Kherson Oblast, Ukraine; a province on the Black Sea
 Kherson Oblast Council
 Kherson Governorate (Government of Kherson), Novorossiya, Russian Empire; a governorate of Russia
 Kherson International Airport, Kherson, Kherson Raion, Kherson Oblast, Ukraine
 Port of Kherson, Kherson, Kherson Raion, Kherson Oblast, Ukraine
 Kherson Shipyard, Port of Kherson, Kherson, Kherson Raion, Kherson Oblast, Ukraine

Events
 Battle of Kherson (March 2022)), Ukraine-Russia War
 Kherson offensive (2022), Ukraine-Russia War

Other uses
 Kherson oat, a strain of spring oats

See also

 Merefa-Kherson bridge, a rail bridge
 Kherson National Technical University
 Kherson State University
 
 Kherson Province (disambiguation)
 Kerson (disambiguation)
 Khersan (disambiguation)
 Chersonesus (disambiguation)